Nozeba is a genus of very small, somewhat amphibious land snails that have a gill and an operculum, semi-terrestrial gastropod mollusks or micromollusk  in the family Iravadiidae.

Species
Species within the genus Nozeba include:
 Nozeba emarginata (Hutton, 1885)
 Nozeba lignicola Hasegawa, 1997
 Nozeba striata Ponder, 1984
 Nozeba topaziaca (Hedley, 1908)
Species brought into synonymy
 Nozeba mica Finlay, 1930: synonym of Nozeba emarginata (Hutton, 1885)

References

  Ponder W. F. (1984) A review of the genera of the Iravadiidae (Gastropoda: Rissoacea) with an assessment of the relationships of the family. Malacologia 25(1): 21-71. page(s): 51-52

Iravadiidae